Florida is a dispersed rural community in the northwest corner of the municipality of Kingston, Frontenac County in Eastern Ontario, Canada.

References

Neighbourhoods in Kingston, Ontario